Arabinan endo-1,5-alpha-L-arabinanase (endo-1,5-alpha-L-arabinanase, endo-alpha-1,5-arabanase, endo-arabanase, 1,5-alpha-L-arabinan 1,5-alpha-L-arabinanohydrolase) is an enzyme with systematic name 5-alpha-L-arabinan 5-alpha-L-arabinanohydrolase. This enzyme catalyses the following chemical reaction

 Endohydrolysis of (1->5)-alpha-arabinofuranosidic linkages in (1->5)-arabinans

This enzyme is most active on linear 1,5-alpha-L-arabinan.

References

External links 
 

EC 3.2.1